Sugar Creek Township is one of the sixteen townships of Wayne County, Ohio, United States.  The 2000 census found 6,502 people in the township, 4,897 of whom lived in the unincorporated portions of the township.

Geography
Located in the eastern part of the county, it borders the following townships:
Baughman Township - north
Tuscarawas Township, Stark County - east
Sugar Creek Township, Stark County - southeast
Paint Township - south
Salt Creek Township - southwest corner
Green Township - northwest corner
East Union Township - west

The village of Dalton is located in northern Sugar Creek Township, and the unincorporated community of Kidron lies in the southwestern part of the township.

Name and history
It is one of five Sugar Creek Townships statewide.

The first settler in Sugar Creek township was James Goudy in 1808.  He established a lumber mill along the banks of Sugar Creek in the northeast part of Sugar Creek township. “Brief Historical Memento of Dalton, Ohio”, August 8, 1940, Carl Lawrence and Dean Norris, pgs. 5 & 53.

Between 1808 and 1810, a road was cut through the densely-forested land from Canton to Wooster.  “Brief Historical Memento of Dalton, Ohio”, August 8, 1940, Carl Lawrence and Dean Norris, pgs. 19 & 51.  Wooster Daily Record, Monday, January 10, 1949, pg. 10.  Wooster Daily Record, Tuesday, September 23, 1957, pg. 9.

In 1812, four townships were created in Wayne County, Sugar Creek, Wooster, Mohican, and Prairie.  “Brief Historical Memento of Dalton, Ohio”, August 8, 1940, Carl Lawrence and Dean Norris, pg. 11.

In 1814, the Church of Sugar Creek was organized and in 1817 the village of Dover (part of present-day Dalton, OH) was surveyed.  Wooster Daily Record, Tuesday, September 23, 1957, pg. 9.

In 1819 the Sonnenberg village (near present-day Kidron, OH) was established in the southwestern part of Sugar Creek township.  These settlers were Mennonites from the canton of Bern in Switzerland.

The post office in Dover (now Dalton) was established in 1825.  “Brief Historical Memento of Dalton, Ohio”, August 8, 1940, Carl Lawrence and Dean Norris, pg. 37.

Like the founders of Kidron, the early settlers of Sugarcreek, Ohio, 20 miles from Sugar Creek township, in Tuscarawas County, also came from the canton of Bern in Switzerland. The settlers of Sugarcreek, however, arrived probably a decade or two later than their Kidron neighbors in the 1830s and 1840s, and were part of the Reformed Church – not Mennonite. Sugarcreek had its post office established in 1888, when it received its official name. Sugarcreek was originally named for a local stream running nearby, and the small settlement of Shanesville, also in Tuscarawas County, later merged with Sugarcreek.

Government
The township is governed by a three-member board of trustees, who are elected in November of odd-numbered years to a four-year term beginning on the following January 1. Two are elected in the year after the presidential election and one is elected in the year before it. There is also an elected township fiscal officer, who serves a four-year term beginning on April 1 of the year after the election, which is held in November of the year before the presidential election. Vacancies in the fiscal officership or on the board of trustees are filled by the remaining trustees.

References

External links
Wayne County township map
County website

Townships in Wayne County, Ohio
Townships in Ohio